Tristan Schwandke (born 23 May 1992) is a German hammer thrower who competed in the men's hammer throw event at the 2020 Summer Olympics.

Career
Schwandke won the hammer throw at the 2020 and 2021 German Athletics Championships. Whilst competing at the 2020 Summer Olympics, Schwandke threw 73.77m to finish ninth in qualifying heat B.

Personal life
In 2021, Schwandke graduated from Wilhelm Buchner Hochschule in Darmstadt, Germany, with a master's degree in automotive engineering. He works as a researcher in the automotive industry in Kempten. He had previously studied automotive engineering at Kempten University of Applied Sciences.

References

1992 births
Living people
Athletes (track and field) at the 2020 Summer Olympics
Olympic athletes of Germany
German male hammer throwers
Sportspeople from Würzburg
20th-century German people
21st-century German people